The 2021 World Draughts Championship at the international draughts took place from June 28 to July 14, 2021 in Tallinn, Estonia under the auspices International Draughts Federation (FMJD). Forty players competed in the tournament, which was played in a COVID bubble at Hotel Viru. In the semi-final all players were divided into four groups. The best three players from each semi-final group went to the final. The championship was played in a round-robin system. The main referee was IR Frank Teer (Netherlands). The winning prize for the tournament was 20,000 euros.

At the same hotel, the 2021 Women's World Draughts Championship took place simultaneously.

Alexander Schwarzman from Russia won his fifth title.

Rules and regulations
The games were played in the official FMJD time rate of the Fischer system, with 1 hour and 20 minutes for the game plus 1 minute per move. Conforming to the FMJD regulations, players were not allowed to agree on a draw before they both made 40 moves. If they did so nevertheless, the referee is obliged to decide on a 0-point for each player.

The final classification was based on the total points obtained. If two or more players had same total points to define the places, the following factors were used to define the places:

 largest number of victories
 best results between these players in direct confrontation
 best results obtained in order of the classification.

For the places 1 - 3, tie-breaks using the Lehmann-Georgiev system (15 minutes and 2 seconds added per move for an unlimited number of games) would be played if necessary; other places were shared.

Schedule

Participants
 The list is preliminary. Alexander Georgiev, Landry Nga, Alain Bukasa, Baatarsukh Munkhjin, Bedia Guy Serges Olivier did not take part in the tournament.

Results

Semifinal

Group A

Group B

Group C

Group D

Final

References

External links
Offiсial site
Final Global Reserve lists
Results grope A
Results grope B
Results grope C
Results grope D
World Championship 2021 all categories finals
Worldchampionship Tallinn 2021, KNDB
Results grope A KNDB
Results grope B KNDB
Results grope C KNDB
Results grope D KNDB
Final KNDB

Draughts world championships
2021 in draughts
2021 in Estonian sport
Sport in Tallinn
International sports competitions hosted by Estonia
Draughts World Championship
Draughts World Championship